Primož Ulaga (born 20 July 1962) is a Yugoslav/Slovenian former ski jumper.

Career
Competing in two Winter Olympics, he won a silver medal in the team large hill competition at Calgary in 1988. Ulaga also won a silver medal at the FIS Ski-Flying World Championships 1988 in Oberstdorf. His best finish at the FIS Nordic World Ski Championships was sixth in the individual large hill event at Seefeld in 1985. He had nine world cup victories between 1981 and 1988.

World Cup

Standings

Wins

External links
  (listed as YUG nationality)
 

1962 births
Living people
Slovenian male ski jumpers
Yugoslav male ski jumpers
Olympic ski jumpers of Yugoslavia
Olympic silver medalists for Yugoslavia
Ski jumpers at the 1984 Winter Olympics
Ski jumpers at the 1988 Winter Olympics
Olympic medalists in ski jumping
Skiers from Ljubljana
Medalists at the 1988 Winter Olympics
Universiade medalists in ski jumping
Universiade silver medalists for Yugoslavia
Competitors at the 1983 Winter Universiade